Ousmane Diawara (born 10 October 1999) is a Malian professional footballer who plays as a striker for Swedish club Landskrona.

Club career

Sweden
Born in Mali, Castel played at youth level for Swedish club FC Djursholm. He had had 29 goals in 31 appearances for the club. He has featured in the Swedish competitions namely U19 Allsvenskan Norra, U19 Allsvenskan Norra Nedflyttningsserie and U19 Allsvenskan Norra - vår in 2017 and 2018.

On 27 March 2019, Diawara joined Division 2 side IFK Stocksund. He played 17 league games, scoring once, as well as one Svenska Cupen game.

In 2021 Diawara joined BK Karlberg. He played 27 league games, scoring 22 goals in total.

References

External links

1999 births
Living people
21st-century Malian people
Malian footballers
Association football forwards
Huddinge IF players
NEROCA FC players
Landskrona BoIS players
Division 2 (Swedish football) players
I-League players
Superettan players
Malian expatriate footballers
Malian expatriate sportspeople in Sweden
Expatriate footballers in Sweden
Malian expatriate sportspeople in India
Expatriate footballers in India